William Percy Gilpin (26 July 1902 – 4 January 1988) was a long serving Bishop of Kingston, Kingston-upon-Thames, England.

Gilpin was educated at King Edward's School, Birmingham and Keble College, Oxford. He was ordained in 1925, and was successively a curate in Solihull; chaplain of Chichester Theological College; Vicar of Manaccan, then Penzance; Director of Religious Education for the Diocese of Gloucester; and finally (before his ordination to the episcopate) the Archdeacon of Southwark. He retired to Ludlow, Shropshire, in 1970.

References

1902 births
1988 deaths
20th-century Church of England bishops
Alumni of Keble College, Oxford
Archdeacons of Southwark
Bishops of Kingston
People educated at King Edward's School, Birmingham